An ontbijtkoek (literally translated breakfast cake) or peperkoek (pepper cake) is a Dutch and Flemish spiced cake. Rye is its most important ingredient, coloring the cake light brown. It is often spiced with cloves, cinnamon, ginger, succade and nutmeg. Several parts of the Netherlands have their own local recipe, of which the most famous is oudewijvenkoek (old woman's cake), which is mostly eaten in the northern regions, and is flavored with aniseed. Ontbijtkoek is traditionally served at breakfast with a thick layer of butter on top, as a replacement for bread, however, due to its sweet taste it is also served as a snack. It is best eaten the day after it is baked. Ontbijtkoek is also found in Indonesia due to its historical colonization by The Netherlands.

Acrylamide
It has been found that ontbijtkoek can often contain extremely high levels of acrylamide, which is most likely a carcinogen, due to the incorporation of baking soda.

See also
 Gingerbread
 Coffee cake
 Lekach

References

Cakes
Dutch cuisine
Dutch words and phrases
Indonesian breads